Kim Su-ro, The Iron King is a 2010 South Korean television series on the life of Suro of Geumgwan Gaya, starring Ji Sung, Bae Jong-ok, Yu Oh-seong, Seo Ji-hye, Go Joo-won, Kang Byul and Lee Pil-mo. It aired on MBC from May 29 to September 18, 2010 on Saturdays and Sundays at 21:45 for 32 episodes.

Plot 
The -budget historical drama charts the life of Kim Su-ro, who unified 12 small countries to become the legendary founder and ruler of Geumgwan Gaya, the city-state of the Gaya confederacy which dominated sea trade and iron working during the Three Kingdoms Period in the 5th century. Kim Su-ro's fiery temperament, charisma and intelligence are his only defense in an extended political struggle, with competition for the throne from his half-brother and lifelong rival, Ijinashi (first king of the state of Daegaya), his former friend Seok Tal-hae, and the dangerous ambitions of Shingwi Ghan.

Cast

Main
Ji Sung as Kim Su-ro
Park Gun-woo as young Kim Su-ro
Bae Jong-ok as Queen Jeong-kyeon, Su-ro and Ijinashi's mother
Yu Oh-seong as Shingwi Gan / Tae-gang
Seo Ji-hye as Heo Hwang-ok, a daughter of an Indian merchant who later becomes Su-ro's wife 
Go Joo-won as Ijinashi, Queen Jeongkyeon's son and later the founder of Daegaya
Won Deok-hyun as young Ijinashi
Kang Byul as Ah-hyo, Princess of Saro State
Lee Pil-mo as Seok Tal-hae, 4th King of Saro State
Shin Dong-ki as young Tal-hae

Supporting

People around Kim Su-ro
Lee Jong-won as Jo-Bang, Su-ro's stepfather
Jang Dong-jik as Yoo-Chun / Deuk-Sun, the Former Emperor Kwangmoo's nephew and Won-Su's son who is Su-ro's helper
Lee Duk-hee as Doctor Ah-jin (nickname: Uiseonhalmi [의선할미])
Kang Shin-il as Seon-Do, a Godfather of international trade and Su-ro's teacher
Yoon Joo-sang as Mul-Soe, a Blacksmith
Choi Soo-rin as Jo-Bang's wife and Su-ro's stepmother
Jung Jae-gon as Sa-Bok, Jo-Bang's pawn

People in Gaya State
Lee Hyo-jung as Yibiga, Ijinashi's biological father
Lee Won-jong as Yeom Sa-chi
Choi Hwa-jung as Nok Sa-dan

People in Silla
Kwon Sung-duk as Namhae-chachawoong
Wang Bit-na as Ah-Ro, Chachawoong's little sister and Park Hyeokgeose's daughter
Kim Shi-won as Ho-Gong

Other
Kim Ki-hyun as Heo Jang-sang, Heo Hwang-ok's father
Kim Hye-eun as Na Chal-nyeo, Goddess of Heaven who protects Sodo
Baek So-mi as Hae-rye, a Bridesmaid
Kim Hyung-beom as Chu-Kyung, Yeom Sa-chi's loyalman
Seo Sung-gwang as Yong-Bi
Chae Bin as Yeo-Ui, Shin Gwi-chon's slave
Lee Ah-jin as Beo-Deul, a Long Prelude Mountain Girl
Jun Jin-gi as Ya-Chul
Joo Ho as Seok-chil
Kim Hyung-il as Kim-Yoong, Su-ro's biological father
Han Min-chae as So-Hwa
Shim Hoon-gi as No-Du
Joo Sung-min

Lawsuit

References

External links
Kim Su-ro, The Iron King official MBC website 
Kim Su-ro, The Iron King at Naver 
Kim Su-ro, The Iron King at MBC Global Media

Korean-language television shows
2010 South Korean television series debuts
2010 South Korean television series endings
MBC TV television dramas
South Korean historical television series